FC Baltika-BFU Kaliningrad is a Russian football team based in Kaliningrad. It was founded in 2021 as the farm-club by FC Baltika Kaliningrad, together with the Immanuel Kant Baltic Federal University. It received the third-tier license for the 2021–22 season.

Current squad
As of 22 February 2023, according to the Second League website.

References

Association football clubs established in 2021
Football clubs in Russia
Sport in Kaliningrad
2021 establishments in Russia